Demetrios Mavromichalis (1809–1882) was a Greek politician and military personnel.

He was born in Mani and was the fifth and last son of Petrobey Mavromichalis. He lived for many years in Paris and pursued a military career. He reached the rank of major general and was an aide to King Otto of Greece. He actively participated in the 23 October 1862 Revolution, and in the provisional government that followed, Demetrios served as Minister of Military Affairs of Greece from 11 October 1862 until 8 February 1863.

He died in Athens, in 1882.

References 

1809 births
1882 deaths
19th-century Greek politicians
Greek MPs 1862–1864
Ministers of Military Affairs of Greece
Mavromichalis family
Maniots